USS McCloy (FF-1038) was the second and final . Commissioned as a destroyer escort, McCloy was redesignated as frigate on 30 June 1975. Decommissioned on 14 December 1990, and stricken from the Navy list on 4 October 1991, McCloy was transferred to Mexico on 12 November 1993, where she was recommissioned as Nicolas Bravo. Named for Lt. Comdr. John C. McCloy, recipient of two Medals of Honor.

Construction
McCloys keel was laid down by the Avondale Shipyard, Inc., Westwego, Louisiana, 15 September 1961; launched 9 June 1962; sponsored by Mrs. Arthur Winstead; and commissioned 21 October 1963, at Charleston, South Carolina.

Service history 
Following outfitting and shakedown McCloy, assigned to Escort Squadron 10, reported to her home port, Newport, Rhode Island, in January 1964. In October, after further specialized training, she commenced training sonar technicians. Employed primarily as a schoolship throughout 1965, she also tested new anti-submarine warfare (ASW) weapons systems for the Operational Test and Evaluation Force. During this period she enhanced her training and testing capabilities as well as her operational abilities by participating in joint United States-Canadian exercises in the spring and fall and in ASW exercises at the end of the year.

In 1966 cruises saw her in the Bermuda area for NATO exercises (April); off the New England and Virginia coasts for convoy escort and ASW exercises (June, July, and August); and in the Caribbean for fleet tactical exercises (November–December). From 16 January until 24 May 1967 she participated in exercise Matchmaker III. This operation, which took McCloy from the Caribbean to northern Europe, was conducted jointly by American, Dutch, British, and Canadian ships. In what was called "Cross Pollinization," McCloy men transferred to the Dutch destroyer  and the British frigate  while men of those ships came on board the American escort vessel.  also participated in the exercise.

McCloy spent the last half of 1967 and the first months of 1968 at Boston, Massachusetts, undergoing overhaul. She got underway again in March and sailed south, the next month, for refresher training at Guantánamo Bay, Cuba. Returning to Newport in June, she departed again 8 July for another extended cruise. On 11 July she arrived at San Juan, Puerto Rico where she joined naval units of the United States, Brazil, and Colombia for UNITAS IX. On 15 July, they commenced a clockwise circumnavigation of South America which first involved ships and planes of eight nations in exercises in the Atlantic, then around the Horn to the Pacific for more of the same, and finally through the Panama Canal back into the Caribbean before the end of the year. She continued her operations in the Atlantic into 1969.

McCloy was reclassified as a frigate (FF-1038) on 30 June 1975.

1980s 
McCloy deployed to the Mediterranean from January to June 1981. During this time frame, her Passive Anti-Submarine Towed Array Sonar Surveillance System (TASS) proved highly capable and successful in extensive tracking of submarines. McCloy returned to her home port in Norfolk, Virginia in June 1981 only to be sent to sea again on short notice to conduct additional Special ASW operations in the Bermuda "Box". McCloy departed Norfolk for another Mediterranean Deployment (MED 5–82) from July to December 1982. Using her primary weapon system, her TASS passive sonar system (a system of passive hydrophones towed behind the ship), she was immediately assigned to tracking of Soviet submarines in the Mediterranean.

Additionally in September 1982,  McCloy was stationed at the entrance to Beirut, Lebanon harbor where an active conflict was ongoing between Israel and the Palestinian Liberation Organization (PLO). She was assigned and completed the escort of nine ships used in the United Nations-arranged PLO evacuation from Beirut, escorting the ships to safe haven ports in the Mediterranean.

McCloy received a Meritorious Unit Commendation (MUC) for unsurpassed ASW accomplishments from 8 June to 22 December 1982 during this deployment. She also received the Sixth Fleet "Hook Em" Award and was designated as the Best ASW Ship in the Atlantic Fleet during the period 1 October 1980 to 31 March 1982 by Commander Naval Surface Force, U.S. Atlantic Fleet. Following this highly successful Med deployment, McCloy again conducted Special ASW Operations in the Western Atlantic Bermuda "Box" environment.

The submarine was towed to Cienfuegos, Cuba for repairs by a Soviet salvage ship beginning on 5 November 1983.

In the late 1980s, McCloy was involved in drug interdiction operations in the Caribbean Sea with a United States Coast Guard law enforcement detachment on board.  She was involved in several large drug busts including a 50-ton marijuana seizure from the vessel Sea Wanderer in November 1986.

On 27 April 1988 McCloy assisted submarine rescue vessel  and salvage ship  in conducting rescue operations following a fire on submarine .

Transfer and Mexican service
McCloy was decommissioned on 14 December 1990, stricken from the Naval Vessel Register on 17 December 1990, and transferred to Mexico on 1 October 1993 along with her sister ship . In the Mexican Navy, McCloy was renamed ARM Nicolás Bravo (E40) for Nicolás Bravo, a Mexican politician and soldier. As of June 2010, Nicolás Bravo was still in service with the Mexican Navy.

Awards
Joint Meritorious Unit Award
Meritorious Unit Commendation with star
Coast Guard Meritorious Unit Commendation
Navy "E" Ribbon (2 awards)
Navy Expeditionary Medal
National Defense Service Medal with star
Humanitarian Service Medal
Coast Guard Special Operations Service Ribbon
Sea Service Deployment Ribbon with star

Sources

External links 

gyrodynehelicopters.com Bronstein class
Navysite.de – FF-1038

 

Bronstein-class frigates
Cold War frigates and destroyer escorts of the United States
Ships built in Bridge City, Louisiana
1962 ships
Bravo-class frigates
Frigates of Mexico
Maritime incidents in 1983